Miodrag Krivokapić (born 22 April 1949) is a Serbian actor. He completed the Zagreb Academy of Dramatic Art in 1975. He remained in Zagreb after graduation, becoming a member of the ensemble of the Gavella Drama Theatre, later moving to the Croatian National Theatre in Zagreb, where he remained until 1986. Upon the breakup of Yugoslavia he left Zagreb, and in 2005 joined the ensemble of the National Theatre in Belgrade. He has appeared in numerous theatre, film, and television productions in Yugoslavia and its successor states.

Selected filmography

Film

References

External links
 

Living people
Serbian male actors
Kosovo Serbs
People from Peja
1949 births